The 1977 Toray Sillook Open  was a women's tennis tournament played on indoor carpet courts in Tokyo, Japan that was a non-tour event, independent of the 1977 WTA Tour. It was the fifth edition of the tournament and was held from 14 September through 18 September, 1977. The first round and the quarterfinals were held in Osaka while the semifinals and final were held at the Yoyogi National Gymnasium in Tokyo. The singles event was the only competition held and was won by second-seeded Virginia Wade who earned $20,000 first-prize money.

Final

Singles

 Virginia Wade defeated  Martina Navratilova 7–5, 5–7, 6–4

Prize money

References

External links
 ITF tournament edition details

Toray Sillook Open
Pan Pacific Open
Toray Sillook Open
Sports competitions in Tokyo
Toray Sillook Open
Toray Sillook Open
Toray Sillook Open